Many science fiction and fantasy stories involve LGBT characters, or otherwise represent themes that are relevant to LGBT issues and the LGBT community. This is a list of notable stories, and/or stories from notable series or anthologies, and/or by notable authors; it is not intended to be all-inclusive.

Novels with LGBT characters and themes, alphabetical by author surname

Short fiction with LGBT characters and themes

Anthologies

Awards
Gaylactic Spectrum Awards
James Tiptree, Jr. Award
Lambda Literary Awards

See also

 Sex and sexuality in speculative fiction
 Gender in speculative fiction
 Queer horror
 LGBT literature
 Lists of gay, lesbian, or bisexual figures in fiction
 List of LGBT figures in mythology

References

External links
Alternative Sexualities in Science Fiction and Fantasy List
Lesbian Science Fiction

List

Science fiction culture
Science fiction lists
LGBT themes in fiction